Danuta Bułkowska-Milej (born 31 January 1959, in Olszanka) is a Polish athlete who competed in the high jump. Her 1984 personal best (1.97 m) stood as the Polish record for 29 years, only being beaten in 2013.

She started her career in the late 1970s. She won the title of the champion of Poland (outdoor) nine times (1977, 1982, 1983, 1984, 1985, 1986, 1987, 1988 and 1989), and five times on the outdoor championships (1983, 1984, 1985, 1986 and 1987). In addition to that, she took part in the 1978 European Championships in Prague and the 1980 Summer Olympics in Moscow. During the 1986 European Championships in Stuttgart she came in seventh, a place she held also at the European Indoor Championships in Liévin 1987. Among her most notable international successes were the bronze medals at the 1985 World Indoor Games in Paris and the European Indoor Championships in Göteborg 1984 and Piraeus 1985.

Competition record

See also
 Polish records in athletics

References

 
 European Indoor Championships

1959 births
Living people
Polish female high jumpers
Athletes (track and field) at the 1980 Summer Olympics
Olympic athletes of Poland
People from Brzeg County
Sportspeople from Opole Voivodeship
Universiade medalists in athletics (track and field)
Universiade bronze medalists for Poland
World Athletics Indoor Championships medalists